Daniel B. Szyld (born 1955 in Buenos Aires) is an Argentinian and American mathematician who is a professor at Temple University in Philadelphia. He has made contributions to numerical and applied linear algebra as well as matrix theory.

Education 
He was admitted without an undergraduate degree to the graduate school at New York University, where he defended his PhD in 1983. While there, he worked as a research assistant for Wassily Leontief.

International awards and appointments 
He was named as a SIAM Fellow and as a fellow of the American Mathematical Society in 2017. In 2020, he was elected president of the International Linear Algebra Society. He was editor-in-chief for the Electronic Transactions on Numerical Analysis from 2005 to 2013 and SIAM Journal on Matrix Analysis and Applications from 2015 to 2020 and is on the editorial boards of several journals, including the Electronic Journal of Linear Algebra (ELA), the Electronic Transactions on Numerical Analysis (ETNA), Linear Algebra and its Applications, Mathematics of Computation, Numerical Linear Algebra with Applications, and Journal of Numerical Analysis and Approximation Theory. A conference in honor of his 65th birthday was held in 2022

Books and edited proceedings

Selected papers

References 

1955 births
Living people
Fellows of the Society for Industrial and Applied Mathematics
Argentine emigrants to the United States
Fellows of the American Mathematical Society
Temple University faculty
20th-century Argentine mathematicians
Algebraists
21st-century American mathematicians
Courant Institute of Mathematical Sciences alumni
20th-century American mathematicians
Scientists from Buenos Aires